was a Japanese shōjo manga magazine published by Shogakukan. Founded in 1980, the magazine ceased publication in March 2002, when it was replaced by the magazine Flowers.

History
Shogakukan began publishing Petit Flower as a regular magazine in 1980, after the success of Flower Comic, a one-off special issue of the manga magazine Bessatsu Shōjo Comic. The magazine targeted a readership of girls in their late teens.

The magazine published works by several of Shogakukan's most notable female manga artists, such as Moto Hagio and Keiko Takemiya. It is credited with launching the careers of Reiko Okano and Keiko Nishi. Petit Flower folded in March 2002, and was replaced the following month with the magazine Flowers.

Serializations and one-shots
 
Mesh by Moto Hagio (1980–1984)
The Visitor by Moto Hagio (1980)
Yumemiru Wakusei by Shio Satō (1980–1984)
Kaze to Ki no Uta by Keiko Takemiya (1981–1984)
Yume no Ishibumi by Toshie Kihara (1982–1997)
4/4 by Moto Hagio (1983)
Kawa yori mo Nagaku Yuruyaka ni by Akimi Yoshida (1983–1985)
Fancy Dance by Reiko Okano (1984–1990)
 Hanshin: Half-God by Moto Hagio (1984)
One Zero by Shio Satō (1984–1986)
X+Y by Moto Hagio (1984)
Blue Moon by Masumi Moriwaki (1985–1988)
Marginal by Moto Hagio (1985–1987)
Tomoi by Wakuni Akisato (1985–1986)
Watashi o Tsuki made Tsuretette! by Keiko Takemiya (1985–1986)
Iguana Girl by Moto Hagio (1992)
A Cruel God Reigns by Moto Hagio (1993–2001)
Amakusa 1637 by Michiyo Akaishi (2000–2002)

Notes

References

Bibliography

1980 establishments in Japan
2002 disestablishments in Japan
Defunct magazines published in Japan
Magazines established in 1980
Magazines disestablished in 2002
Magazines published in Tokyo
Shogakukan magazines
Shōjo manga magazines